Ahn Seung-gyun (born 18 January 1994) is a South Korean actor and model. He is best known for starring in television dramas such as Still 17 (2018), Solomon's Perjury (2016), Tale of Fairy (2018)  and Netflix's All of Us Are Dead (2022).

Personal life

Military service 
Ahn enlisted for mandatory military service on February 17, 2022.

Filmography

Film

Television series

Awards and nominations

References

External links 
 
 
 

1994 births
Living people
21st-century South Korean male actors
South Korean male models
South Korean male television actors
South Korean male film actors